P.J.W. Restaurant Group is an American restaurant holding company. The company currently owns and operates a total of 26 restaurants across 6 brands in Pennsylvania and New Jersey.

History
The company was founded by Robert Platzer and his wife in 1983. In November of 2018, the  P.J.W. Restaurant Group announced  the appointment of Jim Fris as the new CEO. Fris, who was the company's Chief Operating Officer, replaced Bob Platzer, who assumed the role of executive chairman and remained heavily involved in concept development, real estate ventures and philanthropy.

The company has fourteen restaurants in Eastern Pennsylvania, and nine in Southern New Jersey. It also operates a food truck, and there are two P.J. Whelihan's at the Wells Fargo Center in Philadelphia and one at the Liacouras Center (also in Philadelphia), both of which are operated by Aramark, along with a P.J. Whelihan's booth at Boardwalk Hall in Atlantic City.

P.J. Whelihan's provides 10,000 chicken wings for Philadelphia's annual wing-eating contest at Wells Fargo Center every winter on the Friday before the Super Bowl.

The group supports The Ronald McDonald House, Juvenile Diabetes Research Foundation, The Alicia Rose Victorious Foundation for teens battling cancer and local athletic teams, food shelters, clubs and schools in the New Jersey/Pennsylvania area. Platzer was named a South Jersey Entrepreneur of the Year by the Philadelphia Business Journal in 2015.

Restaurant chains
In addition to P. J. Whelihan's, The group has five additional restaurant concepts. The Pour House, which focuses on craft beer and "pub grub"; The ChopHouse and ChopHouse Grille, an American steak and seafood house;  Treno Pizza Bar, which features wood- and brick-fired pizzas and house-made pastas; and Central Taco and Tequila, which serves Mexican Food.

References

External links

Restaurant groups in the United States
Restaurants established in 1983
Haddon Township, New Jersey
Companies based in Camden County, New Jersey